Kim Jong-il (born Yuri Irsenovich Kim; 16 February 1941 – 17 December 2011) was a North Korean politician who was the second supreme leader of North Korea from 1994 to 2011. He led North Korea from the 1994 death of his father Kim Il-sung, the first Supreme Leader, until his own death in 2011, when he was succeeded by his son, Kim Jong-un.

In the early 1980s, Kim had become the heir apparent for the leadership of the Democratic People's Republic of Korea (DPRK) and assumed important posts in the party and army organs. Kim succeeded his father and DPRK founder Kim Il-sung, following the elder Kim's death in 1994. Kim was the General Secretary of the Workers' Party of Korea (WPK), WPK Presidium, Chairman of the National Defence Commission (NDC) of North Korea and the Supreme Commander of the Korean People's Army (KPA), the fourth-largest standing army in the world.

Kim ruled North Korea as a repressive and totalitarian dictatorship. Kim assumed leadership during a period of catastrophic economic crisis amidst the dissolution of the Soviet Union, on which it was heavily dependent for trade in food and other supplies, which brought a famine. While the famine had ended by the late 1990s, food scarcity continued to be a problem throughout his tenure. Kim strengthened the role of the military by his Songun ("military-first") policies, making the army the central organizer of civil society. Kim's rule also saw tentative economic reforms, including the opening of the Kaesong Industrial Park in 2003. In April 2009, North Korea's constitution was amended to refer to him and his successors as the "supreme leader of the DPRK".

The most common colloquial title given to Kim during his lifetime was "Dear Leader" to distinguish him from his father Kim Il-sung, the "Great Leader". Following Kim's failure to appear at important public events in 2008, foreign observers assumed that Kim had either fallen seriously ill or died. On 19 December 2011, the North Korean government announced that he had died two days earlier, whereupon his third son, Kim Jong-un, was promoted to a senior position in the ruling WPK and succeeded him. After his death, Kim was designated the "Eternal General Secretary" of the WPK and the "Eternal Chairman of the National Defence Commission", in keeping with the tradition of establishing eternal posts for the dead members of the Kim family. North Korean media also began referring to Kim as "the General", similar to his father's posthumous designation as "the [eternal] President".

Early life

Birth 
Soviet records show that Kim Jong-il was born Yuri Irsenovich Kim. In literature, it is assumed that he was born in 1941 in either the camp of Vyatskoye, near Khabarovsk, or camp Voroshilov near Nikolsk. According to Lim Jae-cheon, Kim cannot have been born in Vyatskoye as Kim Il-sung's war records show that he arrived at Vyatskoye only in July 1942 and had been living in Voroshilov before, thus Kim Jong-il is generally agreed to have been born in Voroshilov. Kim's mother, Kim Jong-suk, was Kim Il-sung's first wife. Inside his family, he was nicknamed "Yura", while his younger brother Kim Man-il (born Alexander Irsenovich Kim) was nicknamed "Shura".

Kim's official biography states he was born in a secret military camp on Paektu Mountain (Baekdusan Miryeong Gohyang jip) in Chōsen on 16 February 1942. According to one comrade of Kim's mother, Lee Min, word of Kim's birth first reached an army camp in Vyatskoye via radio and that both Kim and his mother did not return there until the following year. Kim Jong-suk died in 1949 due to ectopic pregnancy.

In 1945, Kim was four years old when World War II ended and Korea regained independence from Japan. His father returned to Pyongyang that September, and in late November Kim returned to Korea via a Soviet ship, landing at Sonbong. The family moved into a former Japanese officer's mansion in Pyongyang, with a garden and pool. Kim's brother drowned there in 1948.

Education 
According to his official biography, Kim completed the course of general education between September 1950 and August 1960. He attended Primary School No. 4 and Middle School No. 1 (Namsan Higher Middle School) in Pyongyang. This is contested by foreign academics, who believe he is more likely to have received his early education in the People's Republic of China as a precaution to ensure his safety during the Korean War.

Throughout his schooling, Kim was involved in politics. He was active in the Korean Children's Union and the Democratic Youth League of North Korea (DYL), taking part in study groups of Marxist political theory and other literature. In September 1957, he became vice-chairman of his middle school's DYL branch (the chairman had to be a teacher). He pursued a programme of anti-factionalism and attempted to encourage greater ideological education among his classmates.

Kim is also said to have received English language education in Malta in the early 1970s on his infrequent holidays there as a guest of Prime Minister Dom Mintoff.

The elder Kim had meanwhile remarried and had another son, Kim Pyong-il. Since 1988, Kim Pyong-il has served in a series of North Korean embassies in Europe and was the North Korean ambassador to Poland. Foreign commentators suspect that Kim Pyong-il was sent to these distant posts by his father in order to avoid a power struggle between his two sons.

Ascension to power

Initial career 
Kim Jong-il officially joined the Workers' Party of Korea in July 1961. He rose up the ranks during the 1960s, and benefited greatly from the Kapsan Faction Incident around March 1967, which was the last credible challenge to Kim Il-sung's rule. This incident marked the first time Kim Jong-il was – at age 26 – given official duties by his father, when the younger Kim took part in the investigation and purges that followed the incident.

In addition, Kim Jong-il gave a speech at the plenum; it was his first as a figure of authority. Kim Jong-il's name was also mentioned in public documents, possibly for the first time, indicating that Kim Il-sung might have already planned for the younger to succeed him as leader.

Only six months after, in an unscheduled meeting of the party, Kim Il-sung called for loyalty in the film industry that had betrayed him with An Act of Sincerity. Kim Jong-il himself announced that he was up to the task and thus begun his influential career in North Korean film-making, during which he made significant efforts to further intensify the personality cult of his father and attach himself to it.

In 1973, Kim Jong-il was appointed to the WPK Central Committee. But during the early 1970s, Kim's uncle, Kim Yong-ju, was still widely believed to be Kim Il-sung's eventual successor. At that time, he held top positions in the Central People’s Committee and the SPA Presidium. However, at the same time Kim Jong-il's power was growing, and a power struggle erupted.

At the time, the WPK was heavily focusing ideologically on Kim Il-sung's Juche; while Kim Jong-il actively stood for this process, Kim Yong-ju, having studied in the Soviet Union, supported a more classical view of Marxism and was not fond of the extensive personality cult built around his brother.

This played to Kim Jong-il's advantage: Kim Yong-ju was more and more marginalized, his key allies Kim To-man (director of propaganda) and Pak Yong-guk (director of international liaison) were removed, and he himself was finally attacked by Kim Il-sung. After a Central Committee plenum in February 1974, Kim Yong-ju was demoted to Vice-Premier. And according to Kim Jong-il's official biography, the Central Committee already anointed him as successor to Kim Il-sung.

Heir apparent 

By the time of the Sixth Party Congress in October 1980, Kim's control of the Party operation was complete. He was given senior posts in the Presidium, the Military Commission and the party Secretariat. When he was made a member of the Seventh Supreme People's Assembly in February 1982, international observers deemed him the heir apparent of North Korea. Prior to 1980, he had no public profile and was referred to only as the "Party Centre". At this time Kim assumed the title "Dear Leader", and the government began building a personality cult around him patterned after that of his father, the "Great Leader". Kim was regularly hailed by the media as the "fearless leader" and "the great successor to the revolutionary cause". He emerged as the most powerful figure behind his father in North Korea.

By the 1980s, North Korea began to experience severe economic stagnation. Kim Il-sung's policy of Juche (self-reliance) cut the country off from almost all external trade, even with its traditional partners, the Soviet Union and China. South Korea accused Kim of ordering the 1983 bombing in Rangoon, Burma which killed 17 visiting South Korean officials, including four cabinet members, and another in 1987 which killed all 115 onboard Korean Air Flight 858. A North Korean agent, Kim Hyon-hui, confessed to planting a bomb in the case of the second, saying the operation was ordered by Kim personally.

On 24 December 1991, Kim was also named Supreme Commander of the Korean People's Army. Defence Minister Oh Jin-wu, one of Kim Il-sung's most loyal subordinates, engineered Kim's acceptance by the Army as the next leader of North Korea, despite his lack of military service. The only other possible leadership candidate, Prime Minister Kim Il (no relation), was removed from his posts in 1976. In 1992, Kim Il-sung publicly stated that his son was in charge of all internal affairs in the Democratic People's Republic.

In 1992, radio broadcasts started referring to him as the "Dear Father", instead of the "Dear Leader", suggesting a promotion. His 50th birthday in February was the occasion for massive celebrations, exceeded only by those for the 80th birthday of Kim Il-sung himself on 15 April that same year.

In 1992, Kim made his first public speech during a military parade for the KPA's 60th anniversary and said: "Glory to the officers and soldiers of the heroic Korean People's Army!". These words were followed by a loud applause by the crowd at Pyongyang's Kim Il-sung Square where the parade was held.

Kim was named Chairman of the National Defence Commission on 9 April 1993, making him day-to-day commander of the armed forces.

According to defector Hwang Jang-yop, the North Korean government system became even more centralized and autocratic during the 1980s and 1990s under Kim than it had been under his father. In one example explained by Hwang, although Kim Il-sung required his ministers to be loyal to him, he nonetheless and frequently sought their advice during decision-making. In contrast, Kim Jong-il demanded absolute obedience and agreement from his ministers and party officials with no advice or compromise, and he viewed any slight deviation from his thinking as a sign of disloyalty. According to Hwang, Kim Jong-il personally directed even minor details of state affairs, such as the size of houses for party secretaries and the delivery of gifts to his subordinates.

Leader of North Korea 

On 8 July 1994, Kim Il-sung died at the age of 82 from a heart attack. Kim Jong-il had been his father's designated successor as early as 1974, named commander-in-chief in 1991, and became Supreme Leader upon his father's death.

He officially took over his father's old post as General Secretary of the Workers' Party of Korea on 8 October 1997. In 1998, he was re-elected as chairman of the National Defence Commission, and a constitutional amendment declared that post to be "the highest post of the state." Also in 1998, the Supreme People's Assembly wrote the president's post out of the constitution and designated Kim Il-sung as the country's "Eternal President" in order to honor his memory forever.

Officially, Kim was part of a triumvirate heading the executive branch of the North Korean government along with Premier Choe Yong-rim and parliament chairman Kim Yong-nam (no relation). Kim commanded the armed forces, Choe Yong-rim headed the government and handled domestic affairs and Kim Yong-nam handled foreign relations. However, in practice, Kim, like his father before him, exercised absolute control over the government and the country. Although not required to stand for popular election to his key offices, he was unanimously elected to the Supreme People's Assembly every five years, representing a military constituency, due to his concurrent capacities as supreme commander of the KPA and chairman of the NDC.

Economic policies 
Kim had a "reputation for being almost comically incompetent in matters of economic management". The economy of North Korea struggled throughout the 1990s, primarily due to mismanagement. In addition, North Korea experienced severe floods in the mid-1990s, exacerbated by poor land management. This, compounded with the fact that only 18% of North Korea is arable land and the country's inability to import the goods necessary to sustain industry, led to a severe famine and left North Korea economically devastated. Faced with a country in decay, Kim adopted a "Military-First" policy to strengthen the country and reinforce the regime. On the national scale, the Japanese Foreign Ministry acknowledges that this has resulted in a positive growth rate for the country since 1996, with the implementation of "landmark socialist-type market economic practices" in 2002, keeping the North afloat despite a continued dependency on foreign aid for food.

In the wake of the devastation of the 1990s, the government began formally approving some activity of small-scale bartering and trade. As observed by Daniel Sneider, associate director for research at the Stanford University Asia–Pacific Research Center, this flirtation with capitalism was "fairly limited, butespecially compared to the pastthere are now remarkable markets that create the semblance of a free market system".

In 2002, Kim declared that "money should be capable of measuring the worth of all commodities." These gestures toward economic reform mirror similar actions taken by China's Deng Xiaoping in the late 1980s and early 90s. During a rare visit in 2006, Kim expressed admiration for China's rapid economic progress.

An unsuccessful devaluation of the North Korean won in 2009, initiated or approved by Kim personally, caused brief economic chaos and uncovered the vulnerability of the country's societal fabric in the face of crisis.

Foreign relations 

Kim was known as a skilled and manipulative diplomat. In 1998, South Korean President Kim Dae-jung implemented the "Sunshine Policy" to improve North-South relations and to allow South Korean companies to start projects in the North. Kim announced plans to import and develop new technologies to develop North Korea's fledgling software industry. As a result of the new policy, the Kaesong Industrial Park was constructed in 2003 just north of the de-militarized zone.

In 1994, North Korea and the United States signed an Agreed Framework which was designed to freeze and eventually dismantle the North's nuclear weapons program in exchange for aid in producing two power-generating nuclear reactors and the assurance that it would not be invaded again. In 2000, after a meeting with Madeleine Albright, he agreed to a moratorium on missile construction. In 2002, Kim's government admitted to having produced nuclear weapons since the 1994 agreement. Kim's regime argued the secret production was necessary for security purposesciting the presence of United States-owned nuclear weapons in South Korea and the new tensions with the United States under President George W. Bush. On 9 October 2006, North Korea's Korean Central News Agency announced that it had successfully conducted an underground nuclear test.

Cult of personality 

Kim was the focus of an elaborate personality cult inherited from his father and founder of the DPRK, Kim Il-sung. Kim Jong-il was often the centre of attention throughout ordinary life in the DPRK. On his 60th birthday (based on his official date of birth), mass celebrations occurred throughout the country on the occasion of his Hwangap. In 2010, the North Korean media reported that Kim's distinctive clothing had set worldwide fashion trends.

The prevailing point of view is that the people's adherence to Kim's cult of personality was solely out of respect for Kim Il-sung or out of fear of punishment for failure to pay homage. Media and government sources from outside North Korea generally support this view, while North Korean government sources aver that it was genuine hero worship. The song "No Motherland Without You", sung by the KPA State Merited Choir, was created especially for Kim in 1992 and is frequently broadcast on the radio and from loudspeakers on the streets of Pyongyang.

Human rights record 

According to a 2004 Human Rights Watch report, the North Korean government under Kim was "among the world's most repressive governments", having up to 200,000 political prisoners according to U.S. and South Korean officials, with no freedom of the press or religion, political opposition or equal education: "Virtually every aspect of political, social, and economic life is controlled by the government."

Kim's government was accused of "crimes against humanity" for its alleged culpability in creating and prolonging the 1990s famine. Human Rights Watch characterized him as a dictator and accused him of human rights violations. Amnesty International condemned him for leaving 'millions of North Koreans mired in poverty' and detaining hundreds of thousands of people in prison camps.

Kim Jong-il claimed that the barometer for distinguishing whether a person can be deemed a member of North Korean society and hence entitled to rights 'lies not on the grounds of his social class but on the grounds of his ideology'.

Health and rumors of waning power

2008 reports 
In an August 2008 issue of the Japanese newsweekly Shūkan Gendai, Waseda University professor Toshimitsu Shigemura, an authority on the Korean Peninsula, claimed that Kim died of diabetes in late 2003 and had been replaced in public appearances by one or more stand-ins previously employed to protect him from assassination attempts. In a subsequent best-selling book, The True Character of Kim Jong-il, Shigemura cited apparently unnamed people close to Kim's family along with Japanese and South Korean intelligence sources, claiming they confirmed Kim's diabetes took a turn for the worse early in 2000 and from then until his supposed death three and a half years later he was using a wheelchair. Shigemura moreover claimed a voiceprint analysis of Kim speaking in 2004 did not match a known earlier recording. It was also noted that Kim did not appear in public for the Olympic torch relay in Pyongyang on 28 April 2008. The question had reportedly "baffled foreign intelligence agencies for years".

On 9 September 2008, various sources reported that after he did not show up that day for a military parade celebrating North Korea's 60th anniversary, United States intelligence agencies believed Kim might be "gravely ill" after having suffered a stroke. He had last been seen in public a month earlier.

A former CIA official said earlier reports of a health crisis were likely accurate. North Korean media remained silent on the issue. An Associated Press report said analysts believed Kim had been supporting moderates in the foreign ministry, while North Korea's powerful military was against so-called "Six-Party" negotiations with China, Japan, Russia, South Korea, and the United States aimed towards ridding North Korea of nuclear weapons. Some United States officials noted that soon after rumours about Kim's health were publicized a month before, North Korea had taken a "tougher line in nuclear negotiations". In late August North Korea's official news agency reported the government would "consider soon a step to restore the nuclear facilities in Nyongbyon to their original state as strongly requested by its relevant institutions". Analysts said this meant "the military may have taken the upper hand and that Kim might no longer be wielding absolute authority". By 10 September, there were conflicting reports. Unidentified South Korean government officials said Kim had undergone surgery after suffering a minor stroke and had apparently "intended to attend 9 September event in the afternoon but decided not to because of the aftermath of the surgery". High-ranking North Korean official Kim Yong-nam said, "While we wanted to celebrate the 60th anniversary of the country with general secretary Kim Jong-Il, we celebrated on our own". Song Il-Ho, North Korea's ambassador said, "We see such reports as not only worthless, but rather as a conspiracy plot". Seoul's Chosun Ilbo newspaper reported that "the South Korean embassy in Beijing had received an intelligence report that Kim collapsed on 22 August". The New York Times reported on 9 September that Kim was "very ill and most likely suffered a stroke a few weeks ago, but United States intelligence authorities do not think his death is imminent". The BBC noted that the North Korean government denied these reports, stating that Kim's health problems were "not serious enough to threaten his life", although they did confirm that he had suffered a stroke on 15 August.

Japan's Kyodo News agency reported on 14 September, that "Kim collapsed on 14 August due to stroke or a cerebral hemorrhage, and that Beijing dispatched five military doctors at the request of Pyongyang. Kim will require a long period of rest and rehabilitation before he fully recovers and has complete command of his limbs again, as with typical stroke victims". Japan's Mainichi Shimbun claimed Kim had occasionally lost consciousness since April. Japan's Tokyo Shimbun on 15 September, added that Kim was staying at the Bongwha State Guest House. He was apparently conscious "but he needs some time to recuperate from the recent stroke, with some parts of his hands and feet paralyzed". It cited Chinese sources which claimed that one cause for the stroke could have been stress brought about by the United States delay to remove North Korea from its list of state sponsors of terrorism.

On 19 October, North Korea reportedly ordered its diplomats to stay near their embassies to await "an important message", according to Japan's Yomiuri Shimbun, setting off renewed speculation about the health of the ailing leader.

By 29 October 2008, reports stated Kim suffered a serious setback and had been taken back to the hospital. The New York Times reported that Japanese Prime Minister Taro Aso, on 28 October 2008, stated in a parliamentary session that Kim had been hospitalized: "His condition is not so good. However, I don't think he is totally incapable of making decisions". Aso further said a French neurosurgeon was aboard a plane for Beijing, en route to North Korea. Further, Kim Sung-ho, director of South Korea's National Intelligence Service, told lawmakers in a closed parliamentary session in Seoul that "Kim appeared to be recovering quickly enough to start performing his daily duties". The Dong-a Ilbo newspaper reported "a serious problem" with Kim's health. Japan's Fuji Television network reported that Kim's eldest son, Kim Jong-nam, traveled to Paris to hire a neurosurgeon for his father, and showed footage where the surgeon boarded flight CA121 bound for Pyongyang from Beijing on 24 October. The French weekly Le Point identified him as Francois-Xavier Roux, neurosurgery director of Paris' Sainte-Anne Hospital, but Roux himself stated he was in Beijing for several days and not North Korea. On 19 December 2011, Roux confirmed that Kim suffered a debilitating stroke in 2008 and was treated by himself and other French doctors at Pyongyang's Red Cross Hospital. Roux said Kim suffered few lasting effects.

On 5 November 2008, the North's Korean Central News Agency published 2 photos showing Kim posing with dozens of Korean People's Army (KPA) soldiers on a visit to military Unit 2200 and sub-unit of Unit 534. Shown with his usual bouffant hairstyle, with his trademark sunglasses and a white winter parka, Kim stood in front of trees with autumn foliage and a red-and-white banner. The Times questioned the authenticity of at least one of these photos.

In November 2008, Japan's TBS TV network reported that Kim had suffered a second stroke in October, which "affected the movement of his left arm and leg and also his ability to speak". However, South Korea's intelligence agency rejected this report.

In response to the rumors regarding Kim's health and supposed loss of power, in April 2009, North Korea released a video showing Kim visiting factories and other places around the country between November and December 2008. In 2010, documents released by WikiLeaks purportedly attested that Kim suffered from epilepsy.

According to The Daily Telegraph, Kim was a chain-smoker.

Successor 
Kim's three sons and his brother-in-law, along with O Kuk-ryol, an army general, had been noted as possible successors, but the North Korean government had for a time been wholly silent on this matter.

Kim Yong Hyun, a political expert at the Institute for North Korean Studies at Seoul's Dongguk University, said in 2007: "Even the North Korean establishment would not advocate a continuation of the family dynasty at this point". Kim's eldest son Kim Jong-nam was earlier believed to be the designated heir but he appeared to have fallen out of favor after being arrested at Narita International Airport near Tokyo in 2001 where he was caught attempting to enter Japan on a fake passport to visit Tokyo Disneyland.

On 2 June 2009, it was reported that Kim's youngest son, Kim Jong-un, was to be North Korea's next leader. Like his father and grandfather, he has also been given an official sobriquet, The Brilliant Comrade. Prior to his death, it had been reported that Kim was expected to officially designate the son as his successor in 2012.

Re-election as leader 
On 9 April 2009, Kim was re-elected as chairman of the National Defence Commission and made an appearance at the Supreme People's Assembly. This was the first time Kim was seen in public since August 2008. He was unanimously re-elected and given a standing ovation.

On 28 September 2010, Kim was re-elected as General Secretary of the Workers' Party of Korea.

2010 and 2011 foreign visits 

Kim reportedly visited the People's Republic of China in May 2010. He entered the country via his personal train on 3 May and stayed in a hotel in Dalian. In May 2010, Assistant U.S. Secretary of State for East Asian and Pacific Affairs Kurt Campbell told South Korean officials that Kim had only three years to live, according to medical information that had been compiled. Kim travelled to China again in August 2010, this time with his son, fueling speculation at the time that he was ready to hand over power to his son, Kim Jong-un.

He returned to China again in May 2011, marking the 50th anniversary of the signing of the Treaty of Friendship, Cooperation and Mutual Assistance between China and the DPRK. In late August 2011, he traveled by train to the Russian Far East to meet with President Dmitry Medvedev for unspecified talks.

Late 2011 
There were speculations that the visits of Kim abroad in 2010 and 2011 were a sign of his improving health and a possible slowdown in succession might follow. After the visit to Russia, Kim appeared in a military parade in Pyongyang on 9 September, accompanied by Kim Jong-un.

Death 

It was reported that Kim had died of a suspected heart attack on 17 December 2011 at 8:30am while travelling by train to an area outside Pyongyang. He was succeeded by his youngest son Kim Jong-un, who was hailed by the Korean Central News Agency as the "Great Successor". According to the Korean Central News Agency (KCNA), during his death a fierce snowstorm "paused" and "the sky glowed red above the sacred Mount Paektu" and the ice on a famous lake also cracked so loud that it seemed to "shake the Heavens and the Earth".

Kim's funeral took place on 28 December in Pyongyang, with a mourning period lasting until the following day. South Korea's military was immediately put on alert after the announcement and its National Security Council convened for an emergency meeting, out of concern that political jockeying in North Korea could destabilise the region. Asian stock markets fell soon after the announcement, due to similar concerns.

On 12 January 2012, North Korea called Kim the "eternal leader" and announced that his body would be preserved and displayed at Pyongyang's Kumsusan Memorial Palace. Officials also announced plans to install statues, portraits, and "towers to his immortality" across the country. His birthday of 16 February was declared "the greatest auspicious holiday of the nation" and was named the Day of the Shining Star.

In February 2012, on what would have been his 71st birthday, Kim was posthumously made Dae Wonsu (usually translated as Generalissimo, literally Grand Marshal), the nation's top military rank. He had been named Wonsu (Marshal) in 1992 when North Korean founder Kim Il-sung was promoted to Dae Wonsu. Also in February 2012, the North Korean government created the Order of Kim Jong-il in his honor and awarded it to 132 individuals for services in building a "thriving socialist nation" and for increasing defense capabilities.

Personal life

Family 

There is no official information available about Kim Jong-il's marital history, but he is believed to have been officially married twice and to have had three mistresses. He had three known sons: Kim Jong-nam, Kim Jong-chul and Kim Jong-un. His two known daughters are Kim Sol-song and Kim Yo-jong.

Kim's first wife, Hong Il-chon, was the daughter of a martyr who died during the Korean War. She was handpicked by his father and married to him in 1966. They have a girl called Kim Hye-kyung, who was born in 1968. Soon afterwards, they divorced in 1969.

Kim's first mistress, Song Hye-rim, was a star of North Korean films. She was already married to another man and with a child when they met. Kim is reported to have forced her husband to divorce her. This relationship, which started in 1970, was not officially recognized. They had one son, Kim Jong-nam (1971–2017), who was Kim Jong-il's eldest son. Kim kept both the relationship and the child a secret (even from his father) until he ascended to power in 1994. However, after years of estrangement, Song is believed to have died in Moscow in the Central Clinical Hospital in 2002.

Kim's official wife, Kim Young-sook, was the daughter of a high-ranking military official. His father Kim Il-Sung handpicked her to marry his son. The two were estranged for some years before Kim's death. Kim had a daughter from this marriage, Kim Sol-song (born 1974).

His second mistress, Ko Yong-hui, was a Japanese-born ethnic Korean and a dancer. She had taken over the role of First Lady until her deathreportedly of cancerin 2004. They had two sons, Kim Jong-chul (in 1981) and Kim Jong-un, also "Jong Woon" or "Jong Woong" (in 1983). They also had a daughter, Kim Yo-jong, who was about 23 years old in 2012.

After Ko's death, Kim lived with Kim Ok, his third mistress, who had served as his personal secretary since the 1980s. She "virtually act[ed] as North Korea's first lady" and frequently accompanied Kim on his visits to military bases and in meetings with visiting foreign dignitaries. She traveled with Kim on a secretive trip to China in January 2006, where she was received by Chinese officials as Kim's wife.

According to Michael Breen, author of the book Kim Jong Il: North Korea's Dear Leader, the women intimately linked to Kim never acquired any power or influence of consequence. As he explains, their roles were limited to that of romance and domesticity.

He had a younger sister, Kim Kyong-hui. She was married to Jang Sung-taek, who was executed in December 2013 in Pyongyang, after being falsely charged with treason and corruption.

Personality 

Like his father, Kim had a fear of flying and always travelled by private armored train for state visits to Russia and China. The BBC reported that Konstantin Pulikovsky, a Russian emissary who travelled with Kim across Russia by train, told reporters that Kim had live lobsters air-lifted to the train every day and ate them with silver chopsticks.

Kim was said to be a huge film fan, owning a collection of more than 20,000 video tapes and DVDs. His reported favourite movie franchises included James Bond, Friday the 13th, Rambo, Godzilla, Otoko wa Tsurai yo and Hong Kong action cinema, with Sean Connery and Elizabeth Taylor his favourite male and female actors. Kim was also said to have been a fan of Ealing comedies, inspired by their emphasis on team spirit and a mobilised proletariat. He authored On the Art of the Cinema. In 1978, on Kim's orders South Korean film director Shin Sang-ok and his actress wife Choi Eun-hee were kidnapped in order to build a North Korean film industry. In 2006, he was involved in the production of the Juche-based movie The Schoolgirl's Diary, which depicted the life of a young girl whose parents are scientists, with a KCNA news report stating that Kim "improved its script and guided its production".

Although Kim enjoyed many foreign forms of entertainment, according to former bodyguard Lee Young Kuk, he refused to consume any food or drink not produced in North Korea, with the exception of wine from France. His former chef Kenji Fujimoto, however, has stated that Kim sometimes sent him around the world to purchase a variety of foreign delicacies.

Kim reportedly enjoyed basketball. Former United States Secretary of State Madeleine Albright ended her summit with Kim by presenting him with a basketball signed by NBA legend Michael Jordan. His official biography also claims that Kim composed six operas and enjoyed staging elaborate musicals.

United States Special Envoy for the Korean Peace Talks, Charles Kartman, who was involved in the 2000 Madeleine Albright summit with Kim, characterised Kim as a reasonable man in negotiations, to the point, but with a sense of humor and personally attentive to the people he was hosting. However, psychological evaluations conclude that Kim's antisocial features, such as his fearlessness in the face of sanctions and punishment, served to make negotiations extraordinarily difficult.

The field of psychology has long been fascinated with the personality assessment of dictators, a notion that resulted in an extensive personality evaluation of Kim. The report, compiled by Frederick L. Coolidge and Daniel L. Segal (with the assistance of a South Korean psychiatrist considered an expert on Kim's behavior), concluded that the "big six" group of personality disorders shared by dictators Adolf Hitler, Joseph Stalin and Saddam Hussein (sadistic, paranoid, antisocial, narcissistic, schizoid and schizotypal) were also shared by Kimcoinciding primarily with the profile of Saddam Hussein.

The evaluation found that Kim appeared to pride himself on North Korea's independence, despite the extreme hardships it appears to place on the North Korean peoplean attribute appearing to emanate from his antisocial personality pattern.

Defectors claimed that Kim had 17 different palaces and residences all over North Korea, including a private resort near Baekdu Mountain, a seaside lodge in the city of Wonsan, and Ryongsong Residence, a palace complex northeast of Pyongyang surrounded with multiple fence lines, bunkers and anti-aircraft batteries.

Finances 
According to a 2010 report in the Sunday Telegraph, Kim had US$4billion on deposit in European banks in case he ever needed to flee North Korea. The Sunday Telegraph reported that most of the money was in banks in Luxembourg.

Official titles 
Kim received numerous titles during his rule. In April 2009, North Korea's constitution was amended to refer to him and his successors as the "supreme leader of the DPRK".
 Party Center of the WPK and Member, Central Committee of the WPK (1970s)
 Dear Leader (Chinaehaneun Jidoja) (late 1970s–1994)
 Member, Presidium of the Supreme People's Assembly of the DPRK
 Secretary, Central Committee of the Workers' Party of Korea (1974–1997)
 Presidium member, WPK Central Committee (1980–2011)
 Supreme Commander, Korean People's Army (25 December 199117 December 2011)
 Marshal of the DPRK (1993–2011)
 Chairman, National Defence Commission (1993–2011)
 Great Leader (Widehan Ryongdoja) (July 1994December 2011)
 General Secretary, Workers' Party of Korea (October 1997December 2011)
 Chairman, Central Military Commission (DPRK) (October 1997December 2011)
 Eternal Leader (posthumous) (January 2012present)
 Generalissimo of the DPRK (posthumous) (January 2012present)
 Eternal General Secretary, Workers' Party of Korea (posthumous) (11 April 2012present)
 Eternal Chairman of the National Defence Commission (posthumous) (13 April 2012present)
 Eternal leader of the Workers' Party of Korea (posthumous) (7 May 2016present)
 Eternal leader of Juche Korea (posthumous) (29 June 2016present)

Published works 

According to North Korean sources, Kim published some 890 works during a period of his career from June 1964 to June 1994. According to KCNA, the number of works from 1964 to 2001 was 550. In 2000, it was reported that the Workers' Party of Korea Publishing House has published at least 120 works by Kim. In 2009, KCNA put the numbers as follows:

The Selected Works of Kim Jong-il (Enlarged Edition), whose publishing has continued posthumously, runs into volume 24 in Korean and to volume 15 in English. Volumes three to eight were never published in English.

The Complete Collection of Kim Jong-il's Works is currently in volume 13. There is a "Kim Jong-il's Works Exhibition House" dedicated to his works in North Korea, holding 1,100 of his works and manuscripts.

In his teens and university years, Kim had written poems. He also wrote song lyrics. His first major literary work was On the Art of the Cinema in 1973.

See also 

 Awards and decorations received by Kim Jong-il
 Politics of North Korea
 Residences of North Korean leaders
 Jeongju Gim (Kim)

Notes

References

Citations

Sources

Further reading

External links 

 
 
 – Kim Jong-il's childhood.
 The many family secrets of Kim Jong Il
 "Hidden Daughter" Visits Kim Jong-il Every Year (also includes photos of Kim during his youth)
 BBC, North Korea's secretive 'first family'
 Obituary: Kim Jong-il, BBC News, 19 December 2011.
 

 Yun Sung-gwan

|-

|-

|-

|-

|-

|-

|-

 
1940s births
2011 deaths
People from Khabarovsky District
Children of national leaders
Heads of state of North Korea
North Korean communists
Korean nationalists
Korean expatriates in the Soviet Union
Korean film producers
Leaders of political parties in North Korea
Members of the Supreme People's Assembly
Koryo-saram
Leaders of the Workers' Party of Korea and its predecessors
Members of the 5th Political Committee of the Workers' Party of Korea
Members of the 6th Politburo of the Workers' Party of Korea
Members of the 6th Presidium of the Workers' Party of Korea
Generalissimos
National Heroes of North Korea
20th-century North Korean writers
20th-century North Korean male actors
21st-century North Korean people
North Korean atheists
Politicide perpetrators
Recipients of the Order of Kim Il-sung
Grand Crosses of the National Order of Mali
Recipients of the Medal of Zhukov
Members of the 5th Central Committee of the Workers' Party of Korea
Members of the 6th Central Committee of the Workers' Party of Korea
Members of the 6th Secretariat of the Workers' Party of Korea
21st-century North Korean writers